Saldoida cornuta is a species of shore bug in the family Saldidae. It is found in North America.

References

Articles created by Qbugbot
Insects described in 1901
Saldoidini